Logan Township is one of nine townships in Pike County, Indiana, United States. As of the 2010 census, its population was 474 and it contained 175 housing units.

History
Logan Township was organized in 1846.

Geography
The Patoka River defines the township's southern border.

Unincorporated towns
 Chandler at 
 Coats Spring at 
 Oatsville at 
 Rumble at 
(This list is based on USGS data and may include former settlements.)

Cemeteries
The township contains these seven cemeteries: Barnes, Beck, DeJarnett, Loveless, McGillem, Willis and Wilson.

Major highways

School districts
 Pike County School Corporation

Political districts
 State House District 64
 State Senate District 48

References
 
 United States Census Bureau 2009 TIGER/Line Shapefiles
 IndianaMap

External links
 Indiana Township Association
 United Township Association of Indiana
 City-Data.com page for Logan Township

Townships in Pike County, Indiana
Jasper, Indiana micropolitan area
Townships in Indiana